Star Girls is a Taiwanese anthology magazine published by Tong Li Comics specializing in serialization of manhua comics aimed at young females.  It debuted in July, 1992 and is published six times per year in even-numbered months.

Serializations
Star Girls has featured stories by Lai Ann, Nicky Lee, Jo Chen, I-Huan, and other popular Tong Li comics creators.  Serializations as of 2008 include:
 The Internship of Angel (天使的人間實習) by Lai Ann, 2008
 Me and My Ainia by Lai Ann, 2007–2008
 Xia Ke Sing (霞客行) by Jun Xiao (Sheau Gin), 2007 - current
 The One by Nicky Lee, 2005 - 2014
 Divine Melody by I-Huan, 2003 - current
 The Other Side of the Mirror (manhua) by Jo Chen 1998 - 1999

See also
 Media of Taiwan

References

External links
 Star Girls @ Tong Li

1992 establishments in Taiwan
Bi-monthly magazines
Magazines established in 1992
Magazines published in Taiwan
Manhua magazines
Taiwanese comics titles